Sandhurst railway station, known by National Rail as Sandhurst (Berks), is a railway station in the town of Sandhurst in Berkshire, England. The station is managed by Great Western Railway, who operate services on the North Downs Line from Reading to Guildford, Redhill and Gatwick Airport.

Sandhurst Station has two platforms: Platform 1 for services towards Gatwick Airport and Platform 2 for services towards Reading. The station is unstaffed and has an enquiries and emergencies telephone situated at the bottom of Platform 1. The station uses LED-based live departure boards and audio announcements for reporting arrivals and delays to commuters. , the station has neither a ticket office nor a ticket machine; tickets therefore have to be purchased on a train.

History
A temporary station on this site existed between 1852 and 1853 but it was not until 1909 that the station opened permanently as 'Sandhurst Halt'. In around 1918, there were proposals to site a replacement station and goods yard a 1/4 of a mile northwards along the route, but seemingly, these never came to fruition.

Services
Sandhurst is served by trains approximately every 60 minutes in each direction Monday to Saturday, and every two hours on Sundays.
There are additional trains during peak periods on weekdays.

See also
 Bendigo (formerly Sandhurst) railway station, Australia    
 Sandhurst Road railway station, India

References

External links
Live departure board feed

Railway stations in Berkshire
DfT Category F1 stations
Former South Eastern Railway (UK) stations
Railway stations in Great Britain opened in 1852
Railway stations in Great Britain closed in 1853
Railway stations in Great Britain opened in 1909
Railway stations served by Great Western Railway
Sandhurst, Berkshire
1852 establishments in England